Julia Robinson is a South Australian artist and arts educator. She lectures at Adelaide Central School of Art and her work has been included in the Adelaide Biennial of Australian Art in 2016 and 2020 and The National (New Australian Art) in 2019.

Biography 
Julia Robinson was born in Adelaide in 1981 and studied visual arts at Adelaide Central School of Art. She is married to fellow artist Roy Ananda.

Artistic style and subject 
Robinson works in sculpture and installation art, using textiles and costuming techniques to produce her sculptures. She makes animal figures from scratch, using flywire, fabrics and other materials. Sex and death are major themes of her work and she draws her inspiration from folklore, mythology and the occult. Her artwork, Beatrice, featured in the 2020 Adelaide Biennial of Australian Art and exhibited at the Museum of Economic Botany, is inspired by Scylla from Homer’s The Odyssey and Nathaniel Hawthorne’s short story, ‘Rappacini’s Daughter’.

Awards and Major exhibitions

Awards 

 SALA Festival/The Advertiser (Adelaide) Contemporary Art Prize, 2016

Exhibitions 
 Adelaide Biennial of Australian Art 2020
 The National 2019
 Tamworth Textile Triennial 2017
 Adelaide Biennial of Australian Art 2014

Collections 
 Art Gallery of South Australia
 The Museum of Contemporary Art (Australia))

Publications 
 Robb, Leigh, Robinson, Julie, & Coleman, Claire G. (2020). Monster Theatres: 2020. Art Gallery of South Australia, Adelaide. Worldcat record
 Jenkins, Susan, & Brown, Gillian. (2015). Do It [Adelaide]: 13 February – 25 April 2015. Anne & Gordon Samstag Museum of Art, University of South Australia, Adelaide SA. Worldcat record
 Parker Philip, Isobel, Cunningham, Daniel Mudie, Bullen, Clothilde, & Davis, Anna.(2019). The National 2019: new Australian art. Art Gallery of New South Wales, Carriageworks, $ Museum of Contemporary Art Australia, Sydney, N.S.W. Worldcat record
 Robinson, Julia, MacDonald, Logan, & Slade, Lisa. (2015). One to rot and one to grow. Parkside, SA Contemporary Art Centre of South Australia. Worldcat record
 Mitzevich, Nick. (2014). Dark heart. Art Gallery of South Australia, Adelaide, South Australia. Worldcat record
 Robinson, Julia, & Ananda, Roy. (2004). Primavera 2004: exhibition by young Australian artists. Museum of Contemporary Art, Sydney. Worldcat record
 Robinson, Julia, Ananda, Roy,  & Butterworth, Heather. (2004). Thousand-fold: Julia Robinson and Roy Ananda. [South Australia] [publisher not identified]. Worldcat record

References

External links 
 Adelaide Central School of Art Lecturer Profile

Living people
Artists from Adelaide
Mixed-media artists
21st-century Australian sculptors
Australian art teachers
Artists from South Australia
Australian contemporary artists
1981 births